Sarah Claxton (born 23 September 1979) is a retired English athlete who specialised in the 100 metres hurdles.

Claxton grew up in Colchester, Essex. She attended Monkwick Infant and Junior schools then went on to The Thomas Lord Audley School aged 11.

She finished eighth at the 2008 Olympic Games. She also competed at the 2004 Olympic Games, the 2005 World Championships as well as the World Indoor Championships in 2001, 2003, 2004, 2006 and 2008 without reaching the final round.

Her personal best time for 100m hurdles is 12.81 seconds, achieved in July 2008 in Loughborough. She is a former British record holder in the 60 metres hurdles, with a personal best of 7.96 seconds, achieved in February 2005 in Sheffield. However, this was beaten by Tiffany Porter in 2011 with a time of 7.80s at the 2011 European Athletics Indoor Championships.

She formerly competed in the long jump as well. She finished fourth at the 1998 World Junior Championships. Her personal best jump was 6.60 metres, achieved in August 2003 in Tessenderlo.

References

External links
BOA profile

1979 births
Living people
British female hurdlers
British female long jumpers
Olympic female hurdlers
Olympic athletes of Great Britain
Athletes (track and field) at the 2004 Summer Olympics
Athletes (track and field) at the 2008 Summer Olympics
Commonwealth Games competitors for England
Athletes (track and field) at the 2002 Commonwealth Games
World Athletics Championships athletes for Great Britain
British Athletics Championships winners
AAA Championships winners
Black British sportswomen